Aleksei Anatolyevich Syropyatov (born 27 January 1981) is a Russian former professional footballer.

Club career
He made his Russian Football National League debut for FC SKA Rostov-on-Don on 27 March 2008 in a game against FC Dynamo Bryansk. He played 3 seasons in the FNL.

External links

1981 births
Living people
Russian footballers
Association football defenders
Russian expatriate footballers
Expatriate footballers in Belarus
FC Zvezda Irkutsk players
FC Darida Minsk Raion players
FC Vityaz Podolsk players
FC SKA Rostov-on-Don players
FC Metallurg Lipetsk players
FC Tyumen players
FC Dynamo Stavropol players
FC Dynamo Saint Petersburg players
FC Amkar Perm players
Belarusian Premier League players
Sportspeople from Perm, Russia